Greenstone Hill is a suburb on the East Rand of Gauteng Province in the City of Johannesburg Metropolitan Municipality in South Africa. It has only recently been developed although much of the surrounding areas such as Edenvale and Modderfontein have been developed and established for quite some time.

Transport
It is located within a short drive to O. R. Tambo International Airport (IATA: JNB, ICAO: FAOR), which is Africa's biggest and busiest airport and a major international and domestic transport hub in the region.

Greenstone Hill, along with its neighboring town of Edenvale, are within close proximity to 4 major roads, these being the N3 freeway (Johannesburg Eastern Bypass), the R24 freeeway (which runs from Johannesburg city centre to O.R. Tambo International Airport), Modderfontein Road (R25) and the N12 highway.

Public transport
The rapid rail line Gautrain passes to the east and the north of Greenstone Hill and the closest stations are Rhodesfield and Marlboro. As of October 2018 a midibus service links Greenstone mall to Marlboro station with buses every 30 minutes during peak times and every hour during off peak times.

Businesses
Greenstone Hill is also the location of the Greenstone Shopping Mall  which was opened in 2007. Expansions of this mall and the nearby Stoneridge Centre, along with other smaller shopping center's such as Eden-Meadows, Greenstone Crescent, and Stoneridge Centre has made Greenstone Hill a big drawcard for shoppers and entertainment seekers from all over the city.

The nearby Longmeadow Business Park has made Greenstone Hill a convenient place to purchase residential property and as a result, a lot of residential development has been constructed or is still under construction here. These properties are mostly in the form of town houses and apartments within a Body Corporate, but there are also many free standing houses within residential estates. A 3 bedroom, 2 bathroom town house can be purchased for around R1,550,000 (approx. US$110,000).  The free standing house can be purchased from R2 800 000 up to R6 000 000 (approx. $200k - $428k).

Lifestyle living

The population of Greenstone Hill is generally younger, typically persons who have recently left home or those who have young families. A typical townhouse or apartment complex ranges from 600 to 1100 units where these apartments offer renters or homeowners options from 1 bedroom-1 bathroom through to 3 bedroom-2 bathroom variations. Free standing houses are situated within the 5 residential estates (Thorn Valley Estate, Bushwillow Park Estate, Emerald Estate, Pebble Creek Estate and Waterstone Park Estate).  All of which are considered to be a very secure living option.
Although the square kilometre radius of Greenstone Hill may seem quite small when compared to the neighbouring suburbs, there is a sense of luxury living associated with the area hence a high level of affluent residents and property investors are found in the area.
Greenstone Hill seems to portray a fairly decent active lifestyle where a large contingency of joggers and cyclists are noticeable, this is over and above the advent of a number of gyms and crossfit boxes opening up within the area.

Neighbouring suburbs
Acacia Park, Antwerp, Eastleigh, Edenvale, Illiondale, Longmeadow, Marais Steyn Park, Modderfontein, Rembrandt Park

References

2. Ekurhuleni

Populated places in Ekurhuleni